Musius is a genus of beetles in the family Cerambycidae, containing the following species:

 Musius crassicornis Boppe, 1921
 Musius fuscicornis Fairmaire, 1903
 Musius quadrinodosus Fairmaire, 1889
 Musius rubricollis Fairmaire, 1899

References

Dorcasominae